For Love or Money is a Chinese romance film based on Hong Kong novelist Amy Cheung's 2006 novel of the same name. The film was directed by Gao Xixi and starring Liu Yifei and Rain. Originally slated for release on 11 November 2014, the film was moved earlier to 7 November 2014.

Cast
 Rain as Xu Chengxun
 Liu Yifei as Xing Lu
 Wang Xuebing
 Joan Chen as Xu Chengxun's Mother
 Shao Feng
 Tiffany Tang as Ming Zhen
 Andy On as Lian
 Sun Haiying
 Allen Lin
 Dong Yong

Box office
The film had grossed ¥65.38 million at the Chinese box office.

References

External links
 

2014 films
2010s Mandarin-language films
2014 romantic drama films
Chinese romantic drama films
Films based on Chinese novels
Films directed by Gao Xixi